Arbutus madrensis is a Mexican species of trees in the heath family. It is found in the Sierra Madre Occidental of Durango, Jalisco, Nayarit, and Sinaloa in western Mexico.

References

madrensis
Endemic flora of Mexico
Trees of Durango
Trees of Jalisco
Trees of Nayarit
Trees of Sinaloa
Plants described in 1992